Roy John Luebbe (September 17, 1900 – August 21, 1985) was an MLB catcher who played in eight games for the New York Yankees during the  season. He was hitless in 15 at-bats and was a switch hitter who threw right-handed. 

Despite not having recorded a hit, Luebbe was credited with three runs batted in in his career, the most of any such player . On September 8, 1925, he drove in Ben Paschal and Babe Ruth with a fielder's choice and base on balls respectively. On September 16, he drove in Paschal with a sacrifice fly.

Luebbe was born in Parkersburg, Iowa, and died in Papillion, Nebraska.

References

External links
Baseball Reference.com page

1900 births
1985 deaths
New York Yankees players
Major League Baseball catchers
Baseball players from Iowa
People from Parkersburg, Iowa
Asheville Tourists players
Atlanta Crackers players
Charlotte Hornets (baseball) players
Omaha Buffaloes players
Omaha Packers players
Raleigh Capitals players
Waco Cubs players